Jeanne de Laval (1549–1586), was a French noblewoman. She was the mistress of Henry III of France. She was a lady-in-waiting to the queen, Louise of Lorraine.

Biography 
She was a daughter of Gilles II de Laval-Loué and Louise de Sainte-Maure de Neslé. 
She married on 14 February 1564 François de Saint-Nectaire, State Councilor and Knight of the Order of the Holy Spirit. They had 5 daughters and 1 son : 
 Diane, wife of Christophe de Polignac and maid of honor of Queen Louise of Lorraine, 
 Louise,
 Marie, married François de Belvezeix,
 Hippolyte, married Jean-Antoine de Blou, 
 Magdeleine, maid of honor to Catherine de' Medici, then lady-in-waiting to Anne, Countess of Soissons,
 Henri I de Saint-Nectaire, ambassador in England and Rome, State minister.

She becomes the mistress of King Henry III of France, who appreciated her for her wit. The King had an emotional attachment towards her.
When she was on her deathbed, the King came to see her one last time.

References 
 Pierre de L'Estoile, « Mémoires et registre-journal de Henri III, Henri IV et de Louis XIII », 1837

1549 births
1586 deaths
16th-century French people
Mistresses of French royalty
French ladies-in-waiting